Soltam Systems is an Israeli defense contractor located in Yokneam, Israel. The company has been developing and manufacturing advanced artillery systems, mortars, ammunition and peripheral equipment since 1952. Soltam Systems serves armed and special forces in more than 60 countries. Among the company's major customers are the Israel Defense Forces (IDF), the United States Army and NATO countries.

History

Soltam was founded in 1950 by Shlomo Zabludowicz as the IDF artillery manufacturer. The company was founded as a joint venture between the Israeli Solel Boneh and Luxembourg-based Salgad (Societe Anonyme Luxembourgoise de Gestion et D'Administration) which was a fully owned subsidiary of the Finnish artillery and mortar manufacturer Tampella.

In 1998, Koor Industries sold Soltam to MIKAL Group.

In October 2010, Soltam was sold to Elbit Systems and is now entirely owned by them.

Products

Artillery

 ATMOS 2000 155 mm autonomous, truck mounted self-propelled gun
 ATHOS 2052 155 mm autonomous towed howitzer system
 M-68 towed 155 mm howitzer
 M-71 towed 155 mm howitzer
 Rascal self-propelled 155 mm howitzer
 Slammer (Sholef) - Merkava-based self-propelled 155 mm howitzer

Mortars

Soltam designs and manufactures a wide range of mortars, to suit a variety of military applications. Soltam supplies a variety of mortars, such as backpacked, under turret, towed and self-propelled recoiling mortars on wheeled or tracked vehicles. All mortars are simple to operate and fast in deployment. Soltam mortars are made of high quality alloy steel for extra toughness and stability. Mortar systems come with all auxiliary equipment necessary for field operation, including fire control computer, ballistic computer, INS, and target acquisition and location systems. All types of mortar ammunition in use worldwide are authorized to be used with Soltam mortars.
 
 M-66 160 mm mortar
 120 mm mortar
 Cardom 120 mm autonomous recoil mortar system (RMS)
 Soltam M-65 120 mm mortar towed
Soltam K6 120mm mortar
 81 mm mortar
B499 Long Range
B502 Long Range Split Barrel
B599 Extended Range
CC8 vehicle mounted mortar
CARDOM Recoil Mortar System vehicle mounted mortar
 60 mm mortar
 60 mm commando mortars
 60 mm extended range mortars
 Vehicle mounted 60 mm mortar - internal and external

Ammunition

Soltam manufactures a wide range of mortar ammunition, ranging in caliber and in use (High Explosive HE, Smoke and training). All mortars comply with NATO standards.     
 155 mm
 120 mm
 81 mm
 60 mm

See also

Military equipment of Israel

References

External links
 Elbit Systems (Owners of the Soltam brand)

Defense companies of Israel
Tampella